60 Minutes II (also known as 60 Minutes Wednesday and 60 Minutes) is an American weekly primetime news magazine television program that was intended to replicate the "signature style, journalistic quality and integrity" of the original 60 Minutes series.

It was initially allocated the slot on CBS on Wednesdays, then it was later moved to Fridays at 8:00p.m. The original 60 Minutes continued airing on Sunday nights throughout the run of 60 Minutes II. The first edition of 60 Minutes II ran on January 13, 1999. Its final broadcast was on September 2, 2005.

60 Minutes II was renamed 60 Minutes by CBS for the fall of 2004. CBS News president Andrew Heyward stated at the time, "The Roman numeral II created some confusion on the part of the viewers and suggested a watered-down version." The show was later renamed 60 Minutes Wednesday to differentiate it from the original 60 Minutes Sunday edition, but reverted to its original title on July 8, 2005, when the show moved to the 8:00p.m. Friday timeslot, where it completed its run.

Correspondents
The broadcast included original reporting from its team of correspondents and from other CBS News journalists. The program also featured updated reports on classic 60 Minutes stories.

Credited cast on 60 Minutes II included the following CBS correspondents: Dan Rather, Bob Simon, Charlie Rose, Vicki Mabrey, Scott Pelley and Lara Logan. The following correspondents also worked on segments for the program: Christiane Amanpour, Ed Gordon, Charles Grodin, Carol Marin and Jimmy Tingle. The correspondents from 60 Minutes have reported several stories on 60 Minutes II, Ed Bradley also reported several one-hour special stories as well.

Grodin, Tingle, and Bill Geist contributed semi-humorous commentaries, paralleling the sister program's Andy Rooney.

Killian documents controversy

60 Minutes II ran into controversy in September 2004 when the program staff received a set of documents which alleged that, while in the service of the Texas Air National Guard, United States President George W. Bush was declared unfit for duty and suspended from service. On September 8, 2004, in the middle of the 2004 Presidential election, Dan Rather went on the air on 60 Minutes II with the documents. The authenticity of these documents was quickly called into question by experts and critics. This became known as the Killian documents controversy (or "Rathergate").

For about two weeks, Rather and his team stood by the story, but CBS later announced it could not vouch for the authenticity of the memos. The network stated that using the memos was a "mistake" and Rather apologized for the incident.

These events would lead to Rather's eventual departure from the anchor chair and ouster as correspondent from CBS News on March 9, 2005. Rather later sued in a multi-million dollar employment lawsuit.

Awards
60 Minutes II earned a number of awards, including several Emmy Awards and three Peabody Awards.

References

External links
 

1999 American television series debuts
2005 American television series endings
1990s American television news shows
2000s American television news shows
60 Minutes
English-language television shows
Killian documents controversy
CBS original programming
CBS News
Emmy Award-winning programs
Peabody Award-winning television programs
American television spin-offs
Television series by CBS Studios